Adenike Oladosu (born 1994) is a Nigerian climate activist and initiator of the school strike for climate in Nigeria She has showcased her climate action at international conferences including the UN Climate Change Conference, World Economic Forum, and Elevate festival in Graz-Austria.

In December 2019, Oladosu attended the COP25 gathering in Spain as a Nigerian youth delegate where she gave a "moving address" about climate change in Africa and how it affects lives.

Biography 
Oladosu is from Ogbomosho town in Oyo State, Nigeria. She got her early education at Government Secondary School, Gwagwalada, Abuja. Then she proceeded to the Federal University of Agriculture, Markurdi where she bagged a first class degree in Agricultural Economics.

In 2019, she was selected for the first UN Youth Climate Summit in New York. Recognized by UNICEF Nigeria as a young change-maker, she’s leading a grassroots movement called ILeadClimate, advocating for the restoration of Lake Chad and youth involvement in climate justice through education. She has been recognized by the Human Impact Institute (USA) as one of the 12 women taking climate action in rural communities.

Awards and recognitions 

 Named one of "22 diverse voices to follow on Twitter this Earth Day" by Amnesty International.
 15 ambassador of the African youth climate hub.
 She has been awarded the highest human rights award by Amnesty Nigeria for her fight for climate justice.

References

External links 
 
 
 

1994 births
Living people
21st-century Nigerian women
Nigerian environmentalists
People from Oyo State
Yoruba women activists
Nigerian women activists
Youth climate activists
Nigerian climate activists